The timeline of music technology provides the major dates in the history of electric music technologies inventions from the 1800s to the early 1900s and electronic and digital music technologies from 1874 and electric music technologies to the 2010s.

Dates
1874 : Elisha Gray's Musical Telegraph
1876 : Alexander Graham Bell completed his designs for the telephone. This device contributed to electric technologies that would subsequently be used in music technology)
1877 : The microphone was first invented by David Edward Hughes, despite Thomas Edison being granted the patent. Hughes discovered that electrical currents varied when sound vibrations were passed through carbon packed into a confined space. His first broadcast was of scratching insects.
1877 : Thomas Edison and Emile Berliner simultaneously invented the first prototypes of the phonograph
1888 : Thomas Edison introduces the electric motor-driven phonograph
1896 : Edwin S. Votey completes the first Pianola
1898 : Valdemar Poulsen patents the Telegraphone
1906 : Thaddeus Cahill introduces the Telharmonium to the public
1906 : Lee De Forest invented the Triode, the first vacuum tube
1910 : Utah Mormon and Nathaniel Baldwin construct the first set of headphones from an operator's headband and copper wire. Baldwin failed to commercialize the opportunity through attracting orders from private companies and even the Smithsonian Institute, though the Navy purchased hundreds of sets of them in anticipation of possible world war.
1910 : Vladimir Baranoff-Rossine constructed the Piano Optophonique
1912 : Major Edwin F. Armstrong is issued a patent for a regenerative circuit, making radio reception practical
1915 : Lee de Forest created the Audion Piano
1917 : Leon Theremin invented the prototype of the Theremin, an instrument which is played without touching it, as it detects the proximity of the hands
1921 : First commercial AM radio Broadcast made by KDKA, Pittsburgh, PA
1925 : The Victor Orthophonic Victrola Phonograph was invented. A far superior product in comparison to other phonograph manufacturers was an acoustic  sound design that was far superior to current offerings.
1926 : Jorge Mager presented his electronic instruments, in the Spharaphon line
1927 : Pierre Toulon and Krugg Bass invent the Cellulophone
1928 : René Bertrand invents the Dynaphone
1928 : Fritz Pfleumer patents a system for recording on paper coated with a magnetizable, powdered steel layer, precursor to tape
1929 : Laurens Hammond created the first Hammond Organ
1929 : Nikolay Obukhov commissioned Michel Billaudot and Pierre Duvalie to design the Sonorous Cross
1929 : Peter Lertes and Bruno Helberger developed the Hellertion
1930 : Robert Hitcock completes the Westinghouse Organ 
1930 : Freidrich Trautwein invents the Trautonium
1931 : RCA-Victor began manufacturing 33 1/3 vinyl record players. The Great Depression unfortunately made the market unreceptive due to their high cost and initial marketing of these devices being as "Program Transcriptions", rather than for listening to music. Despite their existence, it was not until 1948 that Columbia Records reintroduced this format. 
1931 : Alan Blumlein, working for EMI in London, in effect, patents stereo
1932 : Nicholas Langer built the Emicon
1932 : Yevgeny Alexandrovith Sholpo constructed the Variophone 
1932 : Harry F. Olson patents the first cardioid ribbon microphone
1933 : Ivan Eremeef invents the Gnome
1934 : NEC engineer Akira Nakishima's switching circuit theory lays foundations for digital circuit design
1934 : Milton Taubman constructed the Electronde
1935 : Yamaha releases Magna Organ, an early electrostatic reed organ
1935 : BASF prepares first plastic-based magnetic tapes
1936 : Harald Bode designed the Warbo Formenn Organ
1936 : Oskar Vierling and Winston Kock designed the Grosstonorgel
1937 : Orson Welles, first director to use studio electronics, during his broadcast of The War of the Worlds
1938 : Georges Jenny develops the Ondioline 
1938 : Benjamin B. Baur of Shure Bros. engineers a single microphone element to produce a cardioid pickup pattern (it picks up less sounds from the sides of the microphone, reducing unwanted sound pickup)
1939 : Homer W. Dudley invented the Parallel Bandpass Vocoder
1940 : Karl Wagner early development of Voice Synthesizers, precursors of the vocoder 
1940 : Homer W. Dudley introduced the Voder Speech Synthesizer 
1940 : The Hammond Organ Company releases the Solovox
1941 : Commercial FM broadcasting begins in the US
1944 : Halim El-Dabh produces The Expression of Zaar, the earliest piece of electroacoustic tape music
1944 : Harold Rhodes built the first prototype of the Rhodes Piano
1945 : The Hammond Organ Company commissioned John Hanert to design the Hanert Synthesizer
1946 : Jennings Musical Instruments releases the Univox
1946 : Raymond Scott patented the Orchestra Machine 
1947 : Constant Martin constructed the Clavioline
1948 : Bell Laboratories reveal the first transistor 
1948 : The microgroove 33-1/3 rpm vinyl record (LP) is introduced by Columbia Records
1951 : Pultec introduces the first passive program equalizer, the EQP-1
1952 : Harry F. Olson and Herbert Belar invent the RCA Synthesizer
1952 : Osmand Kendal develops the Composer-Tron for the Canadian branch of the Marconi Wireless Company
1955 : Ampex develops “Sel-Sync” (Selective Synchronous Recording), making audio overdubbing practical
1956 : Les Paul makes the first 8-track recordings using the “sel-sync” method
1956 : Raymond Scott develops the Clavivox
1958 : First commercial stereo disk recordings produced by Audio Fidelity
1958 : Evgeny Murzin along with several colleagues create the ANS synthesizer
1958 : At Texas Instruments, Jack Kilby creates the first integrated circuit
1959 : Daphne Oram develops a programming technique known as Oramics
1959 : Wurlitzer manufactures The Sideman, the first commercial electro-mechanical drum machine
1963 : Keio Electronics (later Korg) produces the DA-20, an early drum machine
1963 : The Mellotron starts to be manufactured in London
1963 : Phillips introduces the Compact Cassette tape format
1963 : Paul Ketoff designs the SynKet
1964 : Ikutaro Kakehashi debuts Ace Tone R-1 Rhythm Ace, the first electronic drum
1964 : The Moog synthesizer is released
1965 : Nippon Columbia patents an early electronic drum machine
1966 : Korg releases Donca-Matic DE-20, an early electronic drum machine
1967 : Ace Tone releases FR-1 Rhythm Ace, the first electronic drum machine to enter popular music
1967 :  First PCM recorder developed by NHK
1968 : Sharp engineer Tadashi Sasaki conceives single-chip microprocessor
1968 : Release of Shin-ei's Uni-Vibe, designed by Fumio Mieda, an effects pedal with phase shift and chorus effects
1968 : King Tubby pioneers dub music, an early form of popular electronic music
1969 : Matsushita engineer Shuichi Obata invents first direct-drive turntable, Technics SP-10
1970 : ARP 2600 is manufactured
1971 : Busicom's Masatoshi Shima and Intel's Federico Faggin complete 4004, the first commercial microprocessor
1972 : Sord Computer Corporation develop Sord SMP80/08, an early microcomputer
1973 : Yamaha release Yamaha GX-1, the first polyphonic synthesizer
1974 : Yamaha build first digital synthesizer
1976 : Boss, a Roland subsidiary, release Boss CE-1 Chorus Ensemble, the first chorus pedal
1977 : Roland release MC-8 Microcomposer, an early microprocessor-driven CV/Gate digital sequencer
1977 : Apple founder Steve Jobs introduces Apple II, an early home computer
1977 : Sord Computer Corporation introduces Sord M200, an early home computer
1977 : Panafacom releases the Lkit-16, an early 16-bit microcomputer
1978 : Roland releases CR-78, the first microprocessor-driven drum machine
1979 : Casio releases VL-1, the first commercial digital synthesizer
1980 : Fujio Masuoka invents flash memory at Toshiba
1980 : Roland releases TR-808, the most widely used drum machine in popular music
1980 : Roland introduces DCB protocol and DIN interface with TR-808
1980 : Yamaha releases GS-1, the first FM digital synthesizer
1980 : Kazuo Morioka creates Firstman SQ-01, the first bass synthesizer with a music sequencer
1981 : Roland releases TB-303, a bass synthesizer that lays the foundations for acid house music
1981 : Roland founder Ikutaro Kakehashi conceives MIDI
1981 : Toshiba's LMD-649, the first PCM digital sampler, introduced with Yellow Magic Orchestra's Technodelic
1981 : IBM introduces the IBM PC, a 16-bit personal computer
1982 : Sony and Philips introduce compact disc
1982 : First MIDI synthesizers released, Roland Jupiter-6 and Prophet 600
1983 : Introduction of MIDI, unveiled by Roland's Ikutaro Kakehashi and Sequential Circuits' Dave Smith
1983 : Roland releases MSQ-700, the first MIDI sequencer
1983 : Roland releases TR-909, the first MIDI drum machine
1983 : Yamaha releases DX7, the first commercially successful digital synthesizer
1984 : Apple markets the Macintosh computer
1985 : Atari releases the Atari ST computer, designed by Shiraz Shivji
1985 : Akai releases the Akai S612, a digital sampler
1986 : The first digital consoles appear
1987 : Digidesign markets Sound Tools
1988 : Akai introduces the Music Production Controller (MPC) series of digital samplers
1994 : Yamaha unveils the ProMix 01

See also
 Sound recording

References

Music technology
Sound recording